Mathieu Laverdière is a Canadian cinematographer. He is a two-time Canadian Screen Award nominee for Best Cinematography, receiving nominations at the 3rd Canadian Screen Awards in 2015 for Henri Henri and at the 6th Canadian Screen Awards in 2018 for We Are the Others (Nous sommes les autres), and a three-time Quebec Cinema Award nominee for Best Cinematography, receiving nominations at the 15th Jutra Awards in 2013 for The Torrent (Le Torrent), at the 17th Jutra Awards in 2015 for Henri Henri, and at the 22nd Quebec Cinema Awards in 2020 for And the Birds Rained Down (Il pleuvait des oiseaux).

Selected filmography
Lost Song - 2008
Men for Sale (Hommes à louer) - 2008
Twice a Woman (Deux fois une femme) - 2010
Nuit #1 - 2011
Gabrielle - 2013
Love in the Time of Civil War (L'amour au temps de la guerre civile) - 2014
Our Loved Ones (Les êtres chers) - 2015
On My Mother's Side (L'Origine des espèces) - 2016
Shambles (Maudite poutine) - 2016
The Cyclotron - 2016
Before We Explode (Avant qu'on explose) - 2019
The Acrobat (L'Acrobate) - 2019
Laughter (Le Rire) - 2020
Underground (Souterrain) - 2020
A Revision (Une révision) - 2021

References

External links

Canadian cinematographers
French Quebecers
Living people
Year of birth missing (living people)
Best Cinematography Jutra and Iris Award winners